Ableton Live, also known as simply Ableton, is a digital audio workstation for macOS and Windows developed by the German company Ableton. In contrast to many other software sequencers, Ableton Live is designed to be an instrument for live performances as well as a tool for composing, recording, arranging, mixing, and mastering. It is also used by DJs, as it offers a suite of controls for beatmatching, crossfading, and other different effects used by turntablists, and was one of the first music applications to automatically beatmatch songs. Live is available directly from Ableton in three editions: Intro (with limited key features), Standard, and Suite. Ableton also make a fourth version, Lite, with similar limitations to Intro. It is only available bundled with a range of music production hardware, including MIDI controllers and audio interfaces.

History

Ableton Live was created by Gerhard Behles, Robert Henke and Bernd Roggendorf in the mid-1990s. Henke left Ableton in 2016 to concentrate on Monolake. Behles and Henke met while studying programming at the Technical University of Berlin, and wrote software in the music programming language Max to perform techno as their band Monolake. Henke and Behles identified a need in Berlin's electronic music scene for user-friendly software for live performances, and worked with local acts to develop it. Though Live was not developed in Max, Max was used to prototype most of its features. 

Henke said later: "I think the feeling we had was [that] there was enough like-minded people in our closer community who could appreciate a product like this, and that it could work commercially. That gave us confidence to believe that a small company could actually survive on the market." He said one of the first industry figures to recognise Live's potential was the Hollywood composer Hans Zimmer, who was impressed by Live's ability to change the tempo of a loop without altering its pitch. Roggendorf, another programmer, joined Behles and Henke in the late 90s and helped them turn their Max patches into a general set of software for retail. They released the first commercial version of Live on October 30, 2001.  

Unlike Pro Tools, which focuses on multitrack recording, the first version of Ableton Live was designed for performing with loops. It offered sophisticated tools for triggering loops, playing samples and timestretching audio, and was immediately popular with electronic music producers. Live's timestretching algorithm, known as "warping", was particularly notable and gave DJs greater control over mixing and beatmatching, smoothly blending tracks of different tempos. 

Live expanded to become a digital audio workstation (DAW) with a MIDI sequencer and support for virtual studio technology (VST). In 2010, Ableton introduced Max for Live, enabling connectivity between Max and Live. Live made it easier for musicians to use computers as instruments in live performance without programming their own software, influencing the rise of global festival culture in the 2000s.

Features

Views
Live's user interface is composed of two 'Views' – the Arrangement View and the Session View. Live utilizes audio sample or MIDI sequences, referred to as Clips, which are arranged to be played live (i.e. triggered) or played back in a pre-arranged order. MIDI triggers notes on Live's built in instruments, as well as third party VST instruments or external hardware.

The Session View offers a grid-based representation of all of the Clips in a Live Set. These clips can be arranged into scenes which can then be triggered as a unit. For instance a drum, bass and guitar track might comprise a single scene. When moving on to the next scene, which may feature a synth bassline, the artist will trigger the scene, activating the clips for that scene.

The Arrangement View offers a horizontal music production timeline of Clips that is more similar to a traditional software sequencer interface. The Arrangement View is used for recording tracks from the session view and further manipulating their arrangement and effects. It is also used for manual MIDI sequencing.

Instruments 
The Intro version of Live includes four instruments (Impulse, Simpler, Instrument Rack, and Drum Rack) and the Standard version of Live additionally includes External Instrument, with users having the option to purchase additional instruments. By contrast, Live Suite includes all available instruments.
 
 Impulse - a traditional drum triggering instrument which allows the user to define a kit of up to eight drum sounds, each based on a single sample. There are a number of effects available such as basic equalization, attack, decay, pitch shift, etc. Once the kit is defined, rhythms and beats are created through Live's MIDI sequencer.

 Simpler - a basic sampling instrument. It functions using a single audio sample, applying simple effects, and envelopes, finally applying pitch transformations in the form of Granular synthesis. In this case, incoming MIDI does not trigger drums as it does in Impulse, but selects the final pitch of the sample, with C3 playing the sample at its original pitch.
 Drum Rack - a sampler for drums. MIDI notes trigger individual "Simplers" so rather than triggering one sample at multiple pitches, individual samples are triggered at predefined pitches, as is suitable for MIDI drum programming. As is usual with Ableton almost anything can be drag dropped to or from the drum racks; for example, one can drop an audio clip or any MIDI device onto a drum rack note.
 Instrument Rack - allows the user to combine multiple instruments and effects into a single device, allowing for split and layered sounds with customized macro controls.
 Analog - simulates an analog synthesizer.
 Bass - a monophonic virtual analog bass synthesizer.
 Collision - a mallet percussion physical modelling synthesizer.
 Drum Synths - 8 devices for creating drum and percussion sounds via synthesis.
 Electric - an electric piano instrument.
 Operator - an FM synthesizer.
 Poli - a virtual analog synthesizer that combines subtractive and FM synthesis 
 Sampler - an enhanced sampler.
 Tension - a string physical modelling synthesizer.
 Wavetable - a wavetable synthesizer featuring two oscillators and re-mappable modulation sources.

Ableton also offers a selection of Add-on Sample Packs with which a user can expand the sound libraries for their instruments. 
 Session Drums - a collection of sampled drum kits.
 Latin Percussion - a collection of sampled latin percussion hits and loops.
 Essential Instruments Collection - a large collection of acoustic and electric instrument samples.
 Orchestral Instrument Collection - a collection of four different orchestral libraries, which can be purchased individually or as a bundle: Orchestral Strings, Orchestral Brass, Orchestral Woodwinds and Orchestral Percussion. The Orchestral Instrument Collection is included upon purchase of Live Suite but must be downloaded separately.

Dedicated hardware instruments
Akai Professional makes the APC40 mk II, a MIDI controller designed to work solely with Ableton Live. A smaller version, the APC20, was released in 2010. Though there are many MIDI controllers compatible with Live, these Akai units try to closely map the actual Ableton Live layout onto physical space. Novation Digital Music Systems has created the "Launchpad" which is a pad device that has been designed for use with Live. There are currently four different Launchpad models: Launchpad Mini, Launchpad X, Launchpad Pro, and Launchpad Control. Ableton has also released their own MIDI controller, the Push, which is the first pad-based controller that embraces scales and melody. In November 2015, Ableton released an updated MIDI controller, the Push 2, along with Live 9.5. Push 2, in terms of its design, features a new colorful display, improved buttons and pads, and a lighter frame.

Effects
Most of Live's effects are already common effects in the digital signal processing world which have been adapted to fit Live's interface. They are tailored to suit Live's target audience – electronic musicians and DJs - but may also be used for other recording tasks such as processing a guitar rig. The effects featured in Ableton Live are grouped into two categories - MIDI effects and audio effects.

Live is also able to host VST plugins and, on the macOS version, Audio Unit plug-ins as well as Max for Live devices since Live 9.

Working with audio clips
 In addition to the instruments mentioned above, Live can work with samples. Live attempts to do beat analysis of the samples to find their meter, number of bars and the number of beats per minute. This makes it possible for Live to shift these samples to fit into loops that are tied into the piece's global tempo.

Additionally, Live's Time Warp feature can be used to either correct or adjust beat positions in the sample. By setting warp markers to a specific point in the sample, arbitrary points in the sample can be pegged to positions in the measure. For instance a drum beat that fell 250 ms after the midpoint in measure may be adjusted so that it will be played back precisely at the midpoint.

Some artists and online stores, such as The Covert Operators and Puremagnetik, now make available sample packs that are pre-adjusted, with tempo information and warp markers added. The audio files are accompanied with an "analysis file" in Live's native format (.asd files).

Ableton Live also supports Audio To MIDI, which converts audio samples into a sequence of MIDI notes using three different conversion methods including conversion to Melody, Harmony, or Rhythm. Once finished, Live will create a new MIDI track containing the fresh MIDI notes along with an instrument to play back the notes. Audio to midi conversion is not always 100% accurate and may require the artist or producer to manually adjust some notes. See Fourier transform.

Envelopes
Almost all of the parameters in Live can be automated by envelopes which may be drawn either on clips, in which case they will be used in every performance of that clip, or on the entire arrangement. The most obvious examples are volume and track panning, but envelopes are also used in Live to control parameters of audio devices such as the root note of a resonator or a filter's cutoff frequency. Clip envelopes may also be mapped to MIDI controls, which can also control parameters in real-time using sliders, faders and such. Using the global transport record function will also record changes made to these parameters, creating an envelope for them.

User interface
Much of Live's interface comes from being designed for use in live performance, as well as for production. There are few pop up messages or dialogs. Portions of the interface are hidden and shown based on arrows which may be clicked to show or hide a certain segment (e.g. to hide the instrument/effect list or to show or hide the help box).

Live now supports latency compensation for plug-in and mixer automation.

See also 

:Category:Ableton Live users
List of music software

References

External links
Ableton's official website
Ableton Live how-to database
 Free Ableton Courses for Ableton Live users.

 
C++ software
Digital audio workstation software
Music production software
Electronic music software
DJ software
Music looping
Windows multimedia software
MacOS audio editors
MacOS multimedia software